The Kota–Udhampur Weekly Express is an Express train belonging to West Central Railway zone that runs between  and  in India. It is currently being operated with 19805/19806 train numbers on a weekly basis.

Service

The 19805/Kota Udhampur Weekly Express has an average speed of 50 km/hr and covers 1095 km in 21h 45m. The 19660/Udaipur City–Shalimar Weekly Express has an average speed of 53 km/hr and covers 1095 km in 20h 35m.

Route and halts 

The important halts of the train are :

Coach composition

The train has standard LHB rakes with max speed of 110 kmph. The train consists of 18 coaches:

 1 AC II Tier
 3 AC III Tier
 6 Sleeper coaches
 6 General Unreserved
 2 Seating cum Luggage Rake

Traction

Both trains are hauled by a Ghaziabad Loco Shed-based WAM-4 or WAM-1 electric locomotive from Udhampur to Kota and vice versa.

Rake sharing

The train shares its rake with 19803/19804 Kota–Shri Mata Vaishno Devi Katra Weekly Express

See also 

 Kota Junction railway station
 Udhampur railway station
 Kota–Shri Mata Vaishno Devi Katra Weekly Express

References

Notes

External links 

 19806/Udhampur–Kota Weekly Express India Rail Info
 19805/Kota–Udhampur Weekly Express India Rail Info

Transport in Kota, Rajasthan
Transport in Udhampur
Rail transport in Jammu and Kashmir
Rail transport in Punjab, India
Rail transport in Haryana
Rail transport in Delhi
Rail transport in Rajasthan
Express trains in India
Railway services introduced in 2014